Lionel Eugene Hollins (born October 19, 1953) is an American professional basketball coach and former player currently serving as an assistant coach for the Houston Rockets of the National Basketball Association (NBA). A point guard, Hollins played for the Portland Trail Blazers, winning an NBA championship in 1977 and named an NBA All-Star in 1978. The Trail Blazers retired his No. 14.

Playing career

During his ten-year NBA career playing as a point guard he played for five teams, averaging 11.6 points and 4.5 assists per game.
In 1974 Lionel suffered a serious injury from a moped crash when a bicyclist collided. Fortunately this did not affect his career, but ultimately his left pinky and ring finger never healed correctly.

Drafted by the Portland Trail Blazers with the sixth pick of the 1975 NBA draft out of Arizona State University, Hollins was bestowed All-Rookie first team honors that season, averaging 10.8 points in 78 games for the Blazers. Prior to his two seasons at Arizona State, he played two years at Dixie College in St. George, Utah.

He graduated from Arizona State University in 1986 with a degree in sociology.

He was a member of Trail Blazers' 1976–77 championship team, and made his only All-Star Game appearance one year later. He was a member of the NBA All-Defensive team twice, in 1978 and 1979.

On April 18, 2007, the Portland Trail Blazers retired his #14 jersey.

Coaching career
Prior to his head coaching career, Hollins served as an assistant coach at Arizona State in the 1985–86 season and again in the 1987–88 season. He then served as an assistant for the Phoenix Suns under head coaches Cotton Fitzsimmons and Paul Westphal from 1988 to 1995.

In the 1999–2000 season, Hollins acted as the interim head coach while the Grizzlies were still located in Vancouver. He served another stint as interim coach of the Grizzlies in 2004, after the team had moved to Memphis.

Hollins served as head coach for the St. Louis SkyHawks of the United States Basketball League (USBL) in 2002.

On May 14, 2008, Hollins was hired as one of Milwaukee Bucks head coach Scott Skiles' assistants.

On January 25, 2009, Hollins was named the Grizzlies' head coach for the third time in the franchise's history.

On February 11, 2011, Hollins won his 100th career victory, as coach of the Memphis Grizzlies, in an 89–86 victory over the Milwaukee Bucks. That season, he led his team to a 46–36 record, earning the eighth seed in the playoffs. The Grizzlies defeated the number-one seed San Antonio Spurs before losing to the Oklahoma City Thunder in seven games in the Western Conference semifinals.

In the lockout-shortened  NBA season, Hollins' Grizzlies finished the season with a 41–25 record and the best winning percentage in franchise history (.621). After guiding the Grizzlies to a 13–3 record during the month of April, Hollins was named April's Coach of the Month. This streak helped the Grizzlies earn the four seed in the Western Conference, with home court advantage for the first time in franchise history. They lost in the first round to the Los Angeles Clippers in seven games. In 2012–2013, Hollins led Memphis to a franchise record 56-win season. Memphis lost to the  San Antonio Spurs in the Western Conference Finals in a four-game sweep. Differing views between Hollins and management seemed to be pointing to an eventual change despite Hollins' success.

Even though it was announced that Hollins' contract would not be renewed by the team on June 10, 2013, he was still the Grizzlies' most successful coach, having improved the team's record almost every season. He led them to three straight playoff appearances, their first playoff win, a franchise best .683 winning percentage, and the first playoff series victory in franchise history. .

In the time between Memphis and Brooklyn, Hollins chose Kauffman Sports Management Group as his representation.

On July 2, 2014, Hollins and the Brooklyn Nets reached an agreement for him to serve as the team's head coach for the next four seasons. On July 7, 2014, he was officially introduced by the Nets at a press conference. In his first season as head coach, he guided the Nets to the playoffs. On January 10, 2016, he was relieved of his head coaching duties by the Nets after starting the 2015–16 season with a 10–27 record.

On July 31, 2019, the Los Angeles Lakers hired Hollins as an assistant coach. Hollins won his 2nd championship on October 11, 2020 when the Lakers defeated the Miami Heat in the 2020 NBA Finals in 6 games.

On July 3, 2022, the Houston Rockets hired Hollins as an assistant coach.

Personal life
Hollins's son, Austin Hollins, played college basketball for the University of Minnesota's men's basketball team. His son has also played professionally in the EuroLeague, with the Serbian club KK Crvena Zvezda.

His other son, Anthony, played Division 3 basketball for the at-the-time top-ranked team in the country, Washington University in St. Louis Bears. He’s now an orthopedic surgeon.

NBA career statistics

Regular season

|-
| style="text-align:left;"|
| style="text-align:left;"|Portland
| 74 ||  || 25.6 || .421 || – || .721 || 2.4 || 4.1 || 1.8 || .4 || 10.8
|-
| style="text-align:left; background:#afe6ba;"|†
| style="text-align:left;"|Portland
| 76 ||  || 29.3 || .432 || – || .749 || 2.8 || 4.1 || 2.2 || .5 || 14.7
|-
| style="text-align:left;"|
| style="text-align:left;"|Portland
| 81 ||  || 33.8 || .442 || – || .743 || 3.4 || 4.7 || 1.9 || .4 || 15.9
|-
| style="text-align:left;"|
| style="text-align:left;"|Portland
| 64 ||  || 30.7 || .454 || – || .778 || 2.3 || 5.1 || 1.8 || .4 || 15.3
|-
| style="text-align:left;"|
| style="text-align:left;"|Portland
| 20 ||  || 20.7 || .385 || .100 || .642 || 1.0 || 2.5 || 1.5 || .1 || 10.0
|-
| style="text-align:left;"|
| style="text-align:left;"|Philadelphia
| 27 ||  || 29.5 || .415 || .200 || .770 || 2.6 || 4.1 || 1.7 || .3 || 12.2
|-
| style="text-align:left;"|
| style="text-align:left;"|Philadelphia
| 82 ||  || 26.3 || .470 || .133 || .731 || 2.3 || 4.3 || 1.3 || .2 || 9.5
|-
| style="text-align:left;"|
| style="text-align:left;"|Philadelphia
| 81 || 81 || 27.9 || .477 || .125 || .702 || 2.3 || 3.9 || 1.3 || .2 || 11.0
|-
| style="text-align:left;"|
| style="text-align:left;"|San Diego
| 56 || 54 || 32.9 || .437 || .143 || .721 || 2.3 || 6.7 || 2.0 || .3 || 13.5
|-
| style="text-align:left;"|
| style="text-align:left;"|Detroit
| 32 || 0 || 6.8 || .381 || .000 || .846 || .7 || 1.9 || .4 || .0 || 1.8
|-
| style="text-align:left;"|
| style="text-align:left;"|Houston
| 80 || 60 || 24.4 || .461 || .231 || .794 || 2.2 || 5.2 || 1.0 || .1 || 7.6
|- class="sortbottom"
| style="text-align:center;" colspan="2"|Career
| 673 ||  || 27.4 || .444 || .149 || .741 || 2.4 || 4.5 || 1.6 || .3 || 11.6
|- class="sortbottom"
| style="text-align:center;" colspan="2"|All-Star
| 1 || 0 || 23.0 || .375 || – || .800 || .0 || 8.0 || 2.0 || .0 || 10.0

Playoffs

|-
| style="text-align:left;background:#afe6ba;"|1977†
| style="text-align:left;"|Portland
| 19||—||35.9||.417||–||.682||2.7||4.5||2.5||.3||17.3
|-
| style="text-align:left;"|1978
| style="text-align:left;"|Portland
| 6||—||37.2||.449||–||.690||4.8||5.5||1.2||.0||16.7
|-
| style="text-align:left;"|1979
| style="text-align:left;"|Portland
| 3||—||22.0||.308||–||.714||1.0||1.7||1.0||.0||7.0
|-
| style="text-align:left;"|1980
| style="text-align:left;"|Philadelphia
| 18||—||34.3||.416||.000||.794||3.9||6.3||1.5||.2||13.8
|-
| style="text-align:left;"|1981
| style="text-align:left;"|Philadelphia
| 16||—||30.6||.441||.000||.784||2.1||4.1||1.1||.1||10.2
|-
| style="text-align:left;"|1982
| style="text-align:left;"|Philadelphia
| 8||—||14.3||.306||.000||.667||1.1||3.1||1.1||.1||4.3
|-
| style="text-align:left;"|1984
| style="text-align:left;"|Detroit
| 2||—||3.0||.000||–||–||.0||.0||.0||.5||.0
|-
| style="text-align:left;"|1985
| style="text-align:left;"|Houston
| 5||1||18.8||.308||–||1.000||1.8||3.6||.8||.0||3.4
|- class="sortbottom"
| style="text-align:center;" colspan="2"|Career
| 77 || — || 29.8 || .411 || .000 || .733 || 2.7 || 4.5 || 1.5 || .1 || 11.8

Head coaching record

|- 
| align="left" |Vancouver
| align="left" |
| 60||18||42|||| align="center" |7th in Midwest||—||—||—||—
| align="center" |Missed Playoffs
|- 
| align="left" |Memphis
| align="left" |
| 4||0||4|||| align="center" |—||—||—||—||—
| align="center" |—
|- 
| align="left" |Memphis
| align="left" |
| 39||13||26|||| align="center" |5th in Southwest||—||—||—||—
| align="center" |Missed Playoffs
|- 
| align="left" |Memphis
| align="left" |
| 82||40||42|||| align="center" |4th in Southwest||—||—||—||—
| align="center" |Missed Playoffs
|- 
| align="left" |Memphis
| align="left" |
| 82||46||36|||| align="center" |4th in Southwest||13||7||6||
| align="center" |Lost in Conf. Semifinals
|- 
| align="left" |Memphis
| align="left" |
| 66||41||25|||| align="center" |2nd in Southwest||7||3||4||
| align="center" |Lost in First Round
|- 
| align="left" |Memphis
| align="left" |
| 82||56||26|||| align="center" |2nd in Southwest||15||8||7||
| align="center" |Lost in Conf. Finals
|- 
| align="left" |Brooklyn
| align="left" |
| 82||38||44|||| align="center" |3rd in Atlantic||6||2||4||
| align="center" |Lost in First Round
|- 
| align="left" |Brooklyn
| align="left" |
| 37||10||27|||| align="center" |(fired)||—||—||—||—
| align="center" |—
|-class="sortbottom"
| align="left" colspan="2"|Career
| 534||262||272|||| ||41||20||21||||

See also

References

External links

 
 NBA.com coach file
 

1953 births
Living people
20th-century African-American sportspeople
21st-century African-American people
African-American basketball coaches
African-American basketball players
All-American college men's basketball players
American expatriate basketball people in Canada
American men's basketball players
Arizona State Sun Devils men's basketball coaches
Arizona State Sun Devils men's basketball players
Basketball coaches from Kansas
Basketball players from Kansas
Brooklyn Nets head coaches
Detroit Pistons players
Utah Tech Trailblazers men's basketball players
Houston Rockets assistant coaches
Houston Rockets players
Junior college men's basketball players in the United States
Los Angeles Lakers assistant coaches
Memphis Grizzlies assistant coaches
Memphis Grizzlies head coaches
Milwaukee Bucks assistant coaches
National Basketball Association All-Stars
National Basketball Association players with retired numbers
People from Arkansas City, Kansas
People from Germantown, Tennessee
Philadelphia 76ers players
Phoenix Suns assistant coaches
Point guards
Portland Trail Blazers draft picks
Portland Trail Blazers players
San Diego Clippers players
United States Basketball League coaches
Vancouver Grizzlies assistant coaches
Vancouver Grizzlies head coaches